Fischerinidae is a foraminiferal family now in the miliolid superfamily Cornuspiracea that comprises genera that can be free or attached, in which the proloculus is followed by an undivided tubular or spreading second chamber. Commonly, especially in free, i.e. unattached, forms the second chamber is looped around in coils. As diagnostic for the Miliolida the test wall is of imperphorate porcelaneous calcite. The aperture, which is the avenue of egress and ingress for the protoplasm, is terminal; can be rounded or slitlike.

The Fischerinidae was removed from the Miliolacea in which three subfamilies were included beginning with the Calcivertellinae and Cyclogyrinae in the Carboniferous, followed by the Fischerininae in the Jurassic. The Cyclogyrinae and Fischerininae persist in the present. The Calcivertellinae lasted only into the Jurassic.

References

 Alfred R. Loeblich Jr and Helen Tappan, 1964. Sarcodina Chiefly "Thecamoebians" and Foraminiferida; Treatise on Invertebrate Paleontology, Part C Protista 2. Geological Society of America and University of Kansas Press. 
 Alfred R. Loeblich Jr and Helen Tappan,1988. Forminiferal Genera and their Classification. in 

Tubothalamea
Foraminifera families